Derek McKay (13 December 1948 – 20 April 2008) was a Scottish footballer who played as a right winger.

Biography
Derek McKay was born in Banff, Aberdeenshire, on the Moray Firth Coast. McKay began his career with his local Banff based, part-time professional club, Deveronvale FC of the Scottish Highland Football League.

As an 18-year-old McKay transferred to Scottish First Division Football League Club, Dundee FC. He featured in a dozen Dundee league matches.

He next moved to Aberdeen in 1969. In the 1969–70 Scottish Cup his career reached its zenith. McKay scored the winning goals in the quarter- and semi-final matches, before scoring twice in the 3-1 Final win over favourites Celtic. Known afterwards as 'Cup-tie McKay', he left Pittodrie just three matches later after a row over bonuses for the Cup Final.

He next had brief spells in England with Crystal Palace and Barrow.

McKay moved back into the Highland Football League with short spells at Elgin City and Buckie Thistle. He then moved abroad to play in South Africa, Hong Kong and Australia where he settled and worked in the Mail Room of a local hospital in Perth.

McKay died on 20 April 2008 from a heart attack while on holiday in Thailand.

Honours
Aberdeen
 Scottish Cup: 1
 1969–70

References

External links 
 

1948 births
2008 deaths
Scottish footballers
Dundee F.C. players
Aberdeen F.C. players
Crystal Palace F.C. players
Barrow A.F.C. players
Scottish Football League players
English Football League players
People from Banff, Aberdeenshire
Association football wingers
Footballers from Aberdeenshire
Scottish emigrants to Australia
Deveronvale F.C. players
Highland Football League players